is an Italian word meaning "good."

Buono may also refer to:

People
Buono (surname)

Media

 Buono!, a Japanese girl group

Locations
Buono Beach, a public park in Staten Island, New York, USA
San Buono, a comune and town in the Abruzzo region of Italy
Vulcano Buono, a shopping mall and leisure center in Nola, Italy

Other uses
Portoro Buono, a decorative stone from Porto Venere, Italy

See also
Bueno (disambiguation)